On September 7, 1821, Representative-elect Selah Tuthill (DR) of  died before the first meeting of the 17th Congress.  A special election was held November 6–8, 1821 to fill the resulting vacancy.

Election results

Borland took his seat December 3, 1821, at the start of the First Session o the 17th Congress

See also
List of special elections to the United States House of Representatives

References

New York 06
1821
New York 1821 06
1821 New York (state) elections
United States House of Representatives 1821 06
New York 06